The pneumatic otoscope is the standard tool used in diagnosing otitis media. In addition to the pneumatic (diagnostic) head, a surgical head also is useful. The pneumatic head contains a lens, an enclosed light source, and a nipple for attachment of a rubber bulb and tubing. The head is designed so that when a speculum is attached and fitted snugly into the patient’s external auditory canal, an air-tight chamber is produced. In some cases, the addition of a small sleeve of rubber tubing at the end of the plastic speculum or use of a rubber-tipped speculum helps to avoid trauma and improve the air-tight seal. Gently squeezing and releasing the rubber bulb in rapid succession permits observation of the degree of eardrum mobility in response to both positive and negative pressure.

References
 A View Through-Distinguishing Acute Otitis Media From Otitis Media With Effusion THE OTOSCOPE

Ear procedures
Medical equipment